The Agulugou Formation  is located in the Inner Mongolia Autonomous Region and is dated to the Jurassic period.

References

Geology of Inner Mongolia
Geologic formations of China
Jurassic System of Asia